1969 in professional wrestling describes the year's events in the world of professional wrestling.

List of notable promotions 
Only one promotion held notable shows in 1969.

Calendar of notable shows

Championship changes

EMLL

NWA

Debuts
Debut date uncertain:
Bob Roop
Dan Kroffat
Jimmy Snuka
Mike George 
Robert Fuller
Roddy Piper
Tommy Gilbert
Vicky Williams
Villano I
Villano II
February 21  Osamu Kido
June  Pantera Sureña
July 16  Ivan Putski
September 20  Animal Hamaguchi
November  Fishman

Births
January 2  Jimmy Cicero 
January 4  Reno 
January 7  Black Warrior (died in 2023) 
January 12  R. D. Reynolds 
January 13  John Kronus (died in 2007) 
January 18  Dave Bautista
January 24  Pentagón Black
January 30  Takaku Fuke 
February 5  Doug Gilbert
February 9  Kaoru
February 16  Gangrel
February 20:
Esther Moreno
Gedo
March 13  Masakatsu Funaki
March 13  Kazuo Takahashi
March 14  Beulah McGillicutty
March 15  Piratita Morgan(died in 2018) 
April 3  Lance Storm
April 7  Droz
April 11  Dustin Rhodes
April 18  Pimpinela Escarlata
April 22  Kyoko Inoue 
April 24  Hermie Sadler 
May 8  Akebono Tarō
May 20   Road Dogg
May 28  Etsuko Mita
May 30  Lexie Fyfe
June 5  Ric Savage 
June 9  Chip Minton 
June 10  Morphosis
June 12  Héctor Garza(died in 2013)
June 13  Headbanger Thrasher
June 16:
Masao Orihara
Yuji Yasuraoka
June 23  Svetlana Goundarenko 
June 24  Mad Man Pondo
June 27  Mije
July 7  The Great Sasuke
July 14  Kazushi Sakuraba 
July 20  Mike Sanders
July 27  Triple H
July 28  Brian Johnston
July 29  Mike Segura
July 31  Kid Kash
August 17  Dick Togo
August 21  Nathan Jones 
August 26  Angel Orsini
September 2  Joe E. Legend
September 3  Marianna Komlos(died in 2004) 
September 17  Paul Varelans (died in 2021) 
September 20  Megumi Kudo
September 24  Chilly Willy
September 30  Chris Von Erich(died in 1991)
October 7  Malia Hosaka
October 9  Jun Akiyama
October 16  Takao Omori
October 19  Hido (died in 2021)
October 22  Cutie Suzuki
October 26  Kurrgan
October 30  Alex Porteau
November 7  Takako Inoue
November 18  Koichiro Kimura (died in 2014) 
November 30  Conan Stevens 
December 4  Dynamite Kansai
December 13  Emory Hale (died in 2006)
December 17  Kiyoshi Tamura 
December 21  Mauro Ranallo
December 24  Brad Anderson
December 26  Tom Howard
December 27  Chyna(died in 2016)
December 30  Nobukazu Hirai

Deaths
January 9  Ed McLemore 63
January 25  Frank Scarpa 53
April 29  John Foti 41
July 2  Iron Mike DiBiase, 45
August 24  Fred Kohler, 66
August 31  Rocky Marciano, 45
November 3  Tonina Jackson, 52

References

 
professional wrestling